Leoncio Afonso Perez (12 September 1916 – 27 March 2017) was a professor of geography and an intellectual of the Canary Islands. 

Afonso was born in Breña Alta, Canary Islands in September 1916. He made considerable contributions to the study of geography in the region, and he was bestowed an honorary doctorate from the University of La Laguna on 7 March 1997, in recognition of his life's work. His career was dedicated, among other things, to the study of the geography, history and toponymics of the Canary Islands. He died in San Cristobal de la Laguna, Canary Islands in March 2017 at the age of 100.

Works
 Esquema de Geografía Física de Canarias, La Laguna 1953
  Geografía de Tenerife, Ministerio de Educación y Ciencia, Madrid 1974
  Aspectos Geográficos de Madeira y Azores La Laguna 1977
  Canarias (7 fascículos) en Conocer España, Salvat Editores, 1978
  Canarias, en Maravillas de la Península Ibérica, Seleciones, 1979
  “El Modelo Cerealista en la Agricultura Canaria” La Laguna,1982
  Mapas Murales de Canarias (a differentes escalas) 1985
  Geografía Física de Canarias, S/C. de Tfe. 1981
  Mapa Escolar de Canarias, S/C. de Tfe. 1986 (con colaboradores)
  Atlas Básico de Canarias, 1980 (con colaboradores)
  Atlas Interinsular de Canarias (en colaboración) S/C. de Tfe. 1990
  Geografía de Canarias (6 tomos). Director y con diversos trabajos en la misma. S/C. Tfe. 1985
  La toponimia como percepción del Espacio, la Laguna 1991
  Miscelánea de Temas Canarios, Cabildo Insular de Tfe. 1986
  Garafía, en homenaje a Juan Régulo, 1987
  La cubierta de madera en la vivienda rural del NW. de La Palma en Homenaje a Don José Pérez Vidal
  Geografía de La Palma, Santa Cruz de la Palma 1993
  Plan Integral de Norte de la Palma, colaborador, 1986, inédito.
  Góngaro, Origen y rasgos de la toponimia canaria. 1997
  Diversos artículos y prólogos de libros
  Artículos de prensa en La Tarde, Diario de Avisos, El Día y en Ya, (numerosos y en diversas fechas), sobre temas culturales, geográficos y de actualidad

References

1916 births
2017 deaths
Men centenarians
Spanish centenarians